Thoreau's flower moth (Schinia thoreaui) is a moth of the family Noctuidae. It is found in North America, including Maryland, Illinois, Kansas, Oklahoma, Arizona, Ontario and Saskatchewan.

The wingspan is about 32 mm. Adults are on wing from June to August.

The larvae feed on Ambrosia species.

External links
Images
Bug Guide
Moths of Maryland

Schinia
Moths of North America
Moths described in 1870